Alfredo "Ingko Pedong" Mendoza Ouano (October 14, 1924 – November 7, 2014) was a former Mayor of Mandaue City. He also sat on One Cebu's Council of Elders.

Known for his Charismatic leadership, Pedong served three terms as Mayor of Mandaue City. His grandest achievement was the Mandaue Reclamation Project now known as a bustling business district of northern Metro Cebu. His reclamation work parallel to Cebu City’s North Reclamation Area expanded the city’s land mass beyond the old coastline where the port in Tulay was. The completed reclamation area was touted by Ingko Pedong’s son Thadeo, who succeeded him as mayor, as a future city within a city. Indeed, it is now bustling with economic activity. In a way, Cortes is reaping the economic windfall from the seed that the old Ouano planted. When I pass there, I could no longer picture the coastline that I knew in my youth.

Political Descendants 
Ingko Pedong is the father of politician Thadeo Ouano, who was also mayor of Mandaue. and then Board Member of the Province of Cebu.

His granddaughter Emmarie "Lolypop" Ouano-Dizon is the incumbent Cebu 6th Congressional District Representative of the House of Congress.  His grandson Thadeo "Jonkie" Ouan o is one of the 6th District Board Members of the Province of Cebu. His grandson Alfie Ouano sits as Councilor of Consolacion, Cebu. His other grand son Anjong Ouano-Icalina currently sits as Councilor of the City of Mandaue.

Death 
Mandaue's Grand Old Man Pedong Ouano died at 10:10 of November 7, 2014 at the Perpetual Succour Hospital, Cebu City. He was 90.

References

People from Mandaue
Mayors of Mandaue
Lakas–CMD (1991) politicians
Filipino Roman Catholics
1924 births
2014 deaths